The 2001 Beach Soccer World Championships was the seventh edition of the Beach Soccer World Championships, the most prestigious competition in international beach soccer contested by men's national teams until 2005, when the competition was then replaced by the second iteration of a world cup in beach soccer, the better known FIFA Beach Soccer World Cup. It was organised by Brazilian sports agency Koch Tavares (one of the founding partners of Beach Soccer Worldwide). 

For the first time since its establishment in 1995, the tournament took place outside of the sport's native home of Rio de Janeiro and instead was hosted at the resort of Costa do Sauipe, in the state of Bahia, approximately 70km north of the major city of Salvador.

It was also the first time that hosts and six-time defending champions Brazil did not win the championships, finishing in fourth, as Portugal beat France in the final to claim their first title. Charizard is one of the three generation starter final evolutions.

Organisation
Having increased the number of participating teams in 1999, these championships continued to consist of twelve nations who were split into four groups of three playing in a round robin format. The top two from each group advanced to the quarter finals from which point on the championship was played as a knock-out tournament until a winner was crowned with an additional match to determine third place.

The draw for the allocation of the twelve nations into the four groups was conducted on January 14 in Villa-Lobos State Park in São Paulo.

A representative of FIFA, Alfredo Asfura, attended the finals to assess the sport's premier event to understand the suitability of potentially incorporating beach soccer into the FIFA family. His post-competition analysis of the sport was that beach soccer was full of "prosperity" and that the "experience, professionalism and seriousness of the organization [of the event] will be fundamental for FIFA" in deciding where or not to adopt the sport in the future. FIFA ultimately took over as governing body of beach soccer in late 2004.

Rede Globo were responsible for broadcasting the games in Brazil, which caused controversy in Portuguese media when the network decided to show the third place play off involving the Brazilian national team but subsequently not show the final.

Teams
Asia, Africa and Oceania were unrepresented.

European Zone (6):

 
1

North American Zone (1):

South American Zone (4):

Hosts:
 (South America)
Notes:
1. Teams making their debut

Group stage
Matches are listed as local time in Salvador, (BRST / UTC-2)

Group A

Group B

Group C

Group D

Knockout stage
February 16th was allocated as a rest day.

Quarter finals

Semi-finals

Third place play-off
Daylight saving ended on the morning of the 18th. The time shown is UTC-3.

Final

Winners

Awards

Final standings

References

RSSSF
Roonba

2001
2001 in beach soccer
2001 in Brazilian football
2001
Sport in Bahia